In the run up to the 2019 Belgian federal election, various organisations carry out opinion polling to gauge voting intention in Belgium. Results of such polls are displayed in this article.

The date range for these opinion polls are from the previous federal election, held on 25 May 2014, to the present day. The results of the opinion polls conducted on a nationwide basis are usually split into separate numbers for the three Belgian regions. They are therefore split across the tables in the sections below, but seat projections for the Belgian Chamber are presented together.

Flanders
The graph and the table below show the results for the opinion polls conducted in the Flemish Region, and for polls conducted nationwide the part of the results related to the Flemish Region.

Wallonia
The graph and the table below show the results for the opinion polls conducted in the Walloon Region, and for polls conducted nationwide the part of the results related to the Walloon Region.

Brussels

The table below shows the results for the opinion polls conducted in the Brussels Region, and for polls conducted nationwide the part of the results related to the Brussels Region.

Seat projections

The table below shows seat projections for the Belgian Chamber of Representatives when given by the reporting newspaper or polling firm.

By party

By political family 
Tallies for each ideology and probable coalitions. In bold on dark grey, if the coalition commands an absolute majority, in italic on light grey, if the coalition needs DéFI's support (which implies it does not include the N-VA).

Note that "asymetrical" coalitions are now frequent: between 2007 and 2011, PS was part of each cabinet but not sp.a; and between 2014 and 2018, the Michel Government included CD&V but not cdH, as well as the N-VA, of which there is no equivalent in Wallonia.

Notes

References

Opinion polling in Belgium